The 1980 Akron Zips football team represented Akron University in the 1980 NCAA Division I-AA football season as a member of the Ohio Valley Conference. Led by eighth-year head coach Jim Dennison, the Zips played their home games at the Rubber Bowl in Akron, Ohio. They finished the season with a record of 3–7–1 overall and 2–4–1 in OVC play, placing fifth.

Schedule

References

Akron
Akron Zips football seasons
Akron Zips football